Raul Wagner da Conceição Bragança Neto (1946 – April 17, 2014) was the eighth prime minister of São Tomé and Príncipe. He held the post from 19 November 1996 to 5 January 1999. He was a member of the Movement for the Liberation of São Tomé and Príncipe-Social Democratic Party (MLSTP-PSD) and served as a Major in the São Tomé Army.

References 

1946 births
2014 deaths
Movement for the Liberation of São Tomé and Príncipe/Social Democratic Party politicians
Prime Ministers of São Tomé and Príncipe
20th-century São Tomé and Príncipe politicians